Around 2:30 am on July 1, 2017, a shootout occurred at the Power Ultra Lounge nightclub in downtown Little Rock, Arkansas, United States. Twenty-eight people were injured and one hospitalized. No suspects have been identified.

Incident 
On July 1, 2017, a mass shooting occurred at the Power Ultra Lounge in downtown Little Rock, Arkansas, around 2:30 AM CST. The shootout lasted eleven seconds and started about thirty seconds into a break from a concert by rapper Finesse2tymes. An eyewitness stated that the attack happened during the performance and was unexpected, with a large number of individuals lying on the floor in an attempt to avoid the bullets. He also stated, "People didn't know whether to run or stay down cause you couldn't see where he was. You could hear the gun shots. As soon as you saw people trying to run you see them run right back in."

A video from inside the club during the attack, which included audio of at least 24 rounds being fired in about 11 seconds, was posted by a friend of a victim to Facebook.

According to the Little Rock Police Department, 25 people were shot and three were hurt in other ways after a dispute that started in the club. Those shot were between the ages 16 and 35, with three others injured potentially from fleeing the scene. There were no fatalities related to the attack.

Investigation
No suspects in the shooting have been arrested. Police reported that they believed gang members were present at the shooting, and that there was a potentially gang aspect to the shooting. The Police Chief told reporters that "We do not believe this was an act of terror. Some sort of dispute ensued." Investigators also believe that multiple people fired during the event, instead of one single perpetrator.

Hampton, who was 25, and another man were arrested by USMS, FBI and ATF agents in Birmingham, Alabama, before a concert and held for extradition to Arkansas, where they have outstanding warrants. Two handguns and an AK-47 were seized from the car he was in.

Aftermath
The Mayor of Little Rock, Mark Stodola, said he plans to shut down Power Ultra Lounge as a result of the shooting. The venue, which is only zoned as a restaurant and not permitted to host events, also had its alcohol permit suspended by Alcoholic Beverage Control, which said it had been cited for 14 violations since 2012.

On July 11, members of the Pulaski County Quorum Court rejected a proposal by Justice Judy Green to encourage the county's cities to place a 180-day moratorium on performers and concerts which incite or promote violence. Instead, it was amended to encourage "civil discourse among residents" and "positive actions of empowerment and improvement", before passing unanimously. Opponents, including County Attorney Adam Fogleman and City Attorney Tom Carpenter, decried the original's loose definitions and potential to unconstitutionally limit free speech. Green admitted she knew it would not pass, but had wanted to draw media attention to her cause.

See also
 Orlando nightclub shooting
 2017 Cincinnati nightclub shooting
Columbus nightclub shooting

References 

2017 in Arkansas
2017 mass shootings in the United States
Mass shootings in the United States
Non-fatal shootings
Attacks in the United States in 2017
Crimes in Arkansas
History of Little Rock, Arkansas
July 2017 crimes in the United States
Mass shootings in Arkansas
Attacks on nightclubs